Minister of Education is the person in charge of the Ministry of Education of Montenegro (Ministarstvo prosvjete). Miomir Vojinović is the current Minister of Education, since 28 April 2022.

Ministers of Education, since 2006

References

Government ministries of Montenegro
Ministries established in 2006
2006 establishments in Montenegro
Education ministries
Education in Montenegro